Anton Slavchev (born 21 June 1995) is a Bulgarian footballer who plays as a defender for Minyor Pernik.

References

External links
 
 

1995 births
Living people
Bulgarian footballers
FC Lokomotiv 1929 Sofia players
PFC Spartak Pleven players
PFC Minyor Pernik players
First Professional Football League (Bulgaria) players
Association football defenders